Hugo Sá Tavares (born 23 February 1995) also known as Besugo, is a Portuguese footballer who plays for C.D. Santa Clara as a forward.

Football career
On 13 April 2014, Besugo made his professional debut with Santa Clara in a 2013–14 Segunda Liga match against Marítimo B.

References

External links

Stats and profile at LPFP 

1995 births
Living people
Portuguese footballers
Association football forwards
Liga Portugal 2 players
C.D. Santa Clara players